Madalsa Sharma Chakraborty (born 26 September 1991) is an Indian film and television actress best known for portraying Kavya Vanraj Shah in Star Plus's Anupamaa.

Personal life
Madalsa Sharma was born to actress Sheela Sharma and film producer and director Subhash Sharma on 26 September 1991. After completing her schooling from Marble Arch school, she studied English literature at the Mithibai College, Mumbai.

She became interested in acting as a career at an early age. She attended the Kishore Namit Kapoor Acting Institute and took acting lessons and learned dancing under Ganesh Acharya and Shiamak Davar.

She married Mahaakshay Chakraborty, son of Mithun Chakraborty in 2018.

Career
Chakraborty made her acting debut in the 2009 Telugu film Fitting Master by E.V.V. Satyanarayana. The film was a success and Madalsa's performance was appreciated. The next year she made her debut in the Kannada film industry with Shourya, which gave a great boost to Madalsa's career. Also in 2010 she was seen in another Telugu film, Aalasyam Amrutam, under the banner of Suresh Productions. D. Rama Naidu chose Madalsa as the leading lady for the film, not only did the film fare well, but this took Madalsa's career to another level. She received positive comments for her performance in the film.

Her maiden Bollywood film Angel, by choreographer Ganesh Acharya released in February 2011. The film received great comments and Madalsa's performance was the talk of the town. Soon after was another Telugu release, Mem Vayasuku Vacham and her role was well received. The Times of India wrote that she "plays the eye candy very well"

Later in 2014, her second Hindi film, Sooraj Barjatya Rajshri Productions' Samrat & Co. released. The film received very good reviews overall. Samrat & Co. was a great relaunch for Madalsa in Bollywood. This was followed by Chitram Cheppina Katha, Telugu actor Uday Kiran's last film. In April 2014, she had stated that she has been working on three Telugu projects.

In 2020 she made her television debut by portraying Kavya Shah in Star Plus's Anupamaa.

In December 2021, Chakraborty made her digital debut through music video titled Butterfly opposite Namit Khanna, sung by Dev Negi and Swati Sharma.

In May 2022, Chakraborty reprised her role of Kavya Gandhi in Anupamaa's prequel web-series Anupama: Namaste America's last episode.

Filmography

Films

Television

Web series

Music videos

Awards and nominations

References

External links
 
 

1991 births
Living people
Actresses in Hindi cinema
Actresses from Mumbai
Female models from Mumbai
Actresses in Telugu cinema
Actresses in Tamil cinema
Indian film actresses
Actresses in Kannada cinema
Actresses in Punjabi cinema
21st-century Indian actresses